Takhat was the mother of ancient Egyptian Pharaoh Ramesses IX of the 20th Dynasty. 

It is likely that she was the wife of Montuherkhepeshef, a son of Ramesses III.

A chamber of Amenmesse's tomb KV10 was probably usurped and redecorated for her. Parts of a mummy thought to be hers were found.

Sources

People of the Twentieth Dynasty of Egypt
12th-century BC Egyptian women
Ramesses IX